Sularbaşı can refer to:

 Sularbaşı, Alacakaya
 Sularbaşı, İliç